Kevin Johnny Jansen (born 8 April 1992) is a Dutch professional footballer who plays as a midfielder for Finnish club Honka.

Career
Jansen made his professional debut for Excelsior on 5 August 2011, as he replaced Oost in the 79th minute of the Eredivisie home match against Feyenoord (0-2).

In 2019, he played for Gol Gahar in Iran.

On 25 June 2020, FC Dordrecht confirmed the signing of Jansen on a two-year deal.

In June 2021, it was announced that Jansen had signed with Cypriot First Division club PAEEK.

References

External links
 
 Kevin Jansen at Voetbal International 

1992 births
Living people
Dutch footballers
Footballers from Rotterdam
Association football midfielders
Netherlands under-21 international footballers
Eredivisie players
Eerste Divisie players
Persian Gulf Pro League players
Tweede Divisie players
Excelsior Rotterdam players
ADO Den Haag players
NEC Nijmegen players
SC Cambuur players
Gol Gohar players
Quick Boys players
FC Dordrecht players
PAEEK players
FC Honka players
Dutch expatriate footballers
Dutch expatriate sportspeople in Iran
Expatriate footballers in Iran
Dutch expatriate sportspeople in Cyprus
Expatriate footballers in Cyprus
Dutch expatriate sportspeople in Finland
Expatriate footballers in Finland